Márcio Augusto da Silva Barbosa  (born 16 May 1995), commonly known as Marcinho, is a Brazilian professional footballer who plays as a winger for Kawasaki Frontale.

Club career

Early career
Born in Belford Roxo, Rio de Janeiro, Marcinho represented Coritiba's youth setup before being spotted by scouts of Novo Hamburgo in 2015. He made his senior debut for the latter on 1 February 2015, coming on as a second-half substitute in a 2–2 Campeonato Gaúcho home draw against Aimoré.

Marcinho scored his first senior goal on 4 February 2015, netting a last-minute winner in a 2–1 away defeat of Juventude. He finished the tournament with three goals in 14 appearances.

Internacional

Loans to Ypiranga and Brasil de Pelotas
In the middle of 2015, Marcinho joined Internacional and was assigned to the under-20 squad. On 30 August 2016, he was loaned to Ypiranga-RS until the end of the year's Série C.

On 19 January 2017, Marcinho was loaned to Série B side Brasil de Pelotas for one year. A regular starter, he contributed with five league goals in 32 appearances.

2018 season
On 22 December 2017, Marcinho renewed his contract until 2020 and returned to his parent club for the ensuing campaign. He made his first team debut for the club the following 21 January, starting in a 3–0 away defeat of former side Novo Hamburgo.

After the arrivals of Jonathan Álvez and Paolo Guerrero, Marcinho, who was already a backup option, was not utilized by manager Odair Hellmann.

Loan to Fortaleza
On 22 May 2018, Marcinho was loaned to Fortaleza in the second division, until the end of the campaign. He contributed with three goals in 25 appearances as his side returned to the top tier after a 13-year absence, and announced his departure from the club on 2 January 2019.

On 7 February 2019, however, Marcinho rejoined the club on loan until the end of the year.

On 13 August 2021, Kawasaki Frontale announced the signing of Marcinho.

Career statistics
.

Honours

Club
Fortaleza
Campeonato Brasileiro Série B: 2018
Kawasaki Frontale
J1 League: 2021

Individual
J.League Best XI: 2022

References

External links

1995 births
Living people
Sportspeople from Rio de Janeiro (state)
Brazilian footballers
Association football forwards
Campeonato Brasileiro Série B players
Campeonato Brasileiro Série C players
Chinese Super League players
Esporte Clube Novo Hamburgo players
Sport Club Internacional players
Ypiranga Futebol Clube players
Grêmio Esportivo Brasil players
Fortaleza Esporte Clube players
Chongqing Liangjiang Athletic F.C. players
Kawasaki Frontale players
Expatriate footballers in China
Brazilian expatriate sportspeople in China
People from Bedford Roxo